Leandro Trossard (born 4 December 1994) is a Belgian professional footballer who plays as a winger for Premier League club Arsenal and the Belgium national team.

Club career

Genk
Trossard joined the K.R.C. Genk youth academy from the Bocholt academy in 2010. He was promoted to the senior squad in 2012, making his first, albeit brief, debut on 13 May 2012 in a league match against K.A.A. Gent. The game ended 3–1 in favour of Gent. Trossard was introduced in the 87th minute, replacing Stef Peeters. Those three minutes were the only ones he played in the league that season. For several seasons, he was consistently sent out on loan. As a result, he didn't score his first league goal for Genk until over four years later, coming in a 4–1 away loss to K.V. Kortrijk on 25 September 2016. He was brought on as a substitute for Leon Bailey and scored in the 63rd minute, assisted by Bryan Heynen.

In January 2013, Trossard was sent out on loan to Lommel United. In twelve league appearances, he scored seven goals. His debut for Lommel came on 3 February 2013 in a 1–0 away loss to Sint-Truiden. He was introduced as a substitute in the 63rd minute, coming on for Thomas Jutten. Arguably, the greatest game during his loan spell was his hat-trick in a 3–2 home victory over K.F.C. Dessel Sport, in front of 2000 fans at the Soevereinstadion. He scored one in the 11th minute, another in the 60th (from the penalty spot), and the last in the 74th. He was subbed off in the 88th minute.

In July 2013, Trossard was loaned out to K.V.C. Westerlo. In 17 league appearances, he scored three goals. The first of these goals came on 9 August 2013 in a 2–0 away win over his former club Lommel United. He scored in the 74th minute. He made his debut on 3 August 2013 in a 2–2 home draw with A.F.C. Tubize. This was also his first start for the club. Trossard helped Westerlo to promotion to

In July 2014, Trossard was loaned out to Lommel United again. He continued his goal scoring form, finding the net 16 times in 33 league matches. He scored his second career hat-trick for Lommel on 22 March 2015 in a 6-0 demolition of Racing Mechelen. His goals came in the 33rd, 61st, and 69th minutes. That season, Lommel were only nine points off promotion back to the top flight.

In July 2015, Trossard was loaned out again, this time to OH Leuven. In 30 league matches, he scored eight goals. He made his Leuven debut on 25 July 2015 in a 3–1 away loss to the club he had been loaned out from in Genk. Genk didn't enforce the rule of not allowing loanees to play against them, as he was brought off the bench in the 61st minute, replacing Yohan Croizet. His first league goal for Leuven came on 16 August 2015 in a 2–0 victory over Charleroi. He made an immediate impact off the bench. He was brought on for Yohan Croizet in the 82nd minute, and scored in the 85th.

Brighton & Hove Albion
On 26 June 2019, Brighton agreed to sign Trossard, who joined on a four-year deal with an option for an extra year, becoming the club's second signing of the summer, following Matt Clarke's arrival from Portsmouth. Trossard made his debut for The Seagulls on 17 August where he scored the equaliser in the 1–1 home draw against West Ham United. Earlier in the game he was denied a goal for offside by VAR. Trossard scored twice against Norwich in the 2019–20 season, one in the 2–0 home victory on 2 November 2019, and again in a crucial 1–0 away win on 4 July 2020 to help Brighton push further away from the bottom three.

On 31 January 2021, Trossard scored the only goal in a 1–0 home win over Tottenham Hotspur to secure the Seagulls' first home league win of the 2020–21 season.  Trossard played in Brighton's 1–0 away victory over defending champions Liverpool on 3 February claiming their first league win at Anfield since 1982, where he deflected Steven Alzate's shot back onto Alzate, being awarded the assist in the only goal of the game. On 14 March 2021, Trossard scored the winner in a 2–1 away win over Southampton, sealing Brighton's first win over the Saints in Premier League history. Trossard scored the first goal of Brighton's come back from 2–0 down to beat champions Manchester City 3–2 on 18 May, with fans returning to football.

Trossard scored his first goal of the 2021–22 season on 11 September, firing in a 90th-minute winner scoring the only goal of the game in the 1–0 away win over Premier League newcomers Brentford. He conceded a penalty by barging into Conor Gallagher away at Crystal Palace in the first derby game of the season on 27 September, where Wilfried Zaha converted the spot kick to take Palace 1–0 up at the break. However, Neal Maupay scored a 90+5th-minute equaliser to take a point back to the south coast. Trossard scored Brighton's equaliser away at Liverpool on 30 October, completing a stirring fightback, coming from 2–0 down to earn a 2–2 draw. He enjoyed his time in North London in April 2022 by scoring two goals in two games against Arsenal and Tottenham. Opening the scoreline in the 2–1 victory at Arsenal on the 9th and scoring a 90th-minute winner at the Tottenham Hotspur Stadium on his 100th Albion appearance, seven days later. This was his six goal of the season, making it his best scoring season since joining the Sussex club. On 7 May, Trossard assisted two goals and scored one with his chest which had to be reviewed by VAR for potential handball in the 4–0 home thrashing over Manchester United.

Trossard scored his first goal of the 2022–23 season adding Brighton's second in the 2–0 away win at West Ham on 21 August, helping maintain their unbeaten run to 11 games against the Hammers in the Premier League. He scored his first home goal of the season on 4 September, putting Brighton back ahead in the eventual 5–2 home win over Leicester. In their next match on 1 October, Trossard became the first Brighton player to score a Premier League hat-trick in the 3–3 away draw at Liverpool. His first half double meant he was the first player to score two first half goals at Anfield since Wigan's Amr Zaki in October 2008. Trossard's hat-trick also meant he had scored four goals in two appearances at Anfield. Trossard scored his 100th club career goal on 22 October, pulling one back, in the eventual 3–1 away loss at two-time defending champions Manchester City.

In early January 2023, however, Trossard's relations with the club deteriorated sharply after manager Roberto De Zerbi said he would drop the player for leaving a training session without permission. De Zerbi said he did not like the player's attitude or behaviour. In response, agent Josy Comhair accused De Zerbi of having humiliated the player in front of his team mates, saying a transfer was the best solution.

Arsenal 
On 20 January 2023, Arsenal announced the signing of Trossard on a long-term contract. The fee consisted of a guaranteed £20 million, and around a further £7 million in net potential add-ons. He was given the number 19 shirt by the club, and made his debut on 22 January as a substitute against Manchester United. He made his full debut on 27 January against Manchester City in the FA Cup fourth round.

On 11 February 2023, he scored his first goal for the club in a 1–1 draw with Brentford. He made his first Premier League start for Arsenal against Aston Villa on 18 February 2023. He assisted all three of Arsenal's goals in their win at Fulham on 12 March, thus becoming the first player in Premier League history to make a hattrick of assists in the first-half of a game, away from home and the first player since Santi Cazorla to score a hattrick and also register a hattrick of assists in the same season.

International career
Trossard has been called up to the Belgium national football team on multiple occasions. Roberto Martinez first named him in the Belgium squad in September 2018, again one month later when Trossard had to withdraw through injury, Trossard remained on the bench again in March 2019. He made his debut on 5 September 2020 in a Nations League game against Denmark, he substituted Dries Mertens in the 80th minute of the 2–0 away victory. On his first international start, Trossard scored his first goal for his country also adding a second in an 8–0 crushing of Belarus in a 2022 World Cup qualifier on 30 March 2021.

Trossard was named in Belgium's 26-man squad for Euro 2020 on 17 May 2021, with the tournament taken place in the summer of 2021 due to the previous year's postponement as a result of the COVID-19 pandemic. He made his first appearance of the tournament in Belgium's final group match against Finland on 21 June with Belgium already through to the knockouts. Trossard started the match later being replaced by Thomas Meunier in the 75th minute of the 2–0 victory at the Krestovsky Stadium in Saint Petersburg that secured the Belgian's top spot of Group B. This turned out to be his only game as Belgium were knocked out by Italy in the quarter-final after a 2–1 defeat at the Allianz Arena in Munich on 2 July.

In October 2021, Trossard was a part of Belgium's squad for the UEFA Nations League Finals in Italy. He made two substitute appearances where Belgium lost to France in the semi-final and losing again to Italy in the third-place match to come fourth.

In an international friendly at home against Burkina Faso on 29 March 2022, Trossard scored his third goal for his country, where he also assisted Hans Vanaken's and Christian Benteke's goals in the 3–0 Belgium win. On 8 June, he scored his second international brace in the 6–1 home thrashing over Poland in the UEFA Nations League.

On 10 November, Trossard was named in Belgium's 26-man squad for the 2022 FIFA World Cup.

Career statistics

Club

International

''As of match played 1 December 2022. Belgium score listed first, score column indicates score after each Trossard goal.

Honours
Genk
 Belgian First Division A: 2018–19
 Belgian Cup: 2012–13

Westerlo
 Belgian Second Division: 2013–14

References

External links

Leandro Trossard at the Arsenal F.C. website
Leandro Trossard at the Premier League website

1994 births
Living people
People from Maasmechelen
Belgian footballers
Association football defenders
Association football wingers
K.R.C. Genk players
Lommel S.K. players
K.V.C. Westerlo players
Oud-Heverlee Leuven players
Brighton & Hove Albion F.C. players
Arsenal F.C. players
Belgian Pro League players
Challenger Pro League players
Premier League players
Belgium youth international footballers
Belgium under-21 international footballers
Belgium international footballers
UEFA Euro 2020 players
2022 FIFA World Cup players
Belgian expatriate footballers
Expatriate footballers in England
Belgian expatriate sportspeople in England
Footballers from Limburg (Belgium)